Manganese tetrafluoride, MnF4, is the highest fluoride of manganese. It is a powerful oxidizing agent and is used as a means of purifying elemental fluorine.

Preparation
Manganese tetrafluoride was first unequivocally prepared in 1961 by the reaction of manganese(II) fluoride (or other MnII compounds) with a stream of fluorine gas at 550 °C: the MnF4 sublimes into the gas stream and condenses onto a cold finger. This is still the commonest method of preparation, although the sublimation can be avoided by operating at increased fluorine pressure (4.5–6 bar at 180–320 °C) and mechanically agitating the powder to avoid sintering of the grains. The reaction can also be carried out starting from manganese powder in a fluidized bed.

Other preparations of MnF4 include the fluorination of MnF2 with krypton difluoride, or with F2 in liquid hydrogen fluoride solution under ultraviolet light. Manganese tetrafluoride has also been prepared (but not isolated) in an acid–base reaction between antimony pentafluoride and K2MnF6 as part of a chemical synthesis of elemental fluorine.
K2MnF6 + 2 SbF5 → MnF4 + 2 KSbF6

Chemistry

Decomposition
Manganese tetrafluoride is in equilibrium with manganese(III) fluoride and elemental fluorine:
MnF4  MnF3 +  F2

Other reactions
Manganese tetrafluoride reacts violently with water and even with sodium-dried petroleum ether. It immediately decomposes on contact with moist air.

Reaction with alkali metal fluorides or concentrated hydrofluoric acid gives the yellow hexafluoromanganate(IV) anion [MnF6]2−.

Applications
The main application of manganese tetrafluoride is in the purification of elemental fluorine. Fluorine gas is produced by electrolysis of anhydrous hydrogen fluoride (with a small amount of potassium fluoride added as a support electrolyte) in a Moissan cell. The technical product is contaminated with HF, much of which can be removed by passing the gas over solid KF, but also with oxygen (from traces of water) and possibly heavy-metal fluorides such as arsenic pentafluoride (from contamination of the HF). These contaminants are particularly problematic for the semiconductor industry, which uses high-purity fluorine for etching silicon wafers. Further impurities, such as iron, nickel, gallium and tungsten compounds, can be introduced if unreacted fluorine is recycled.

The technical-grade fluorine is purified by reacting it with MnF3 to form manganese tetrafluoride. As this stage, any heavy metals present will form involatile complex fluorides, while the HF and O2 are unreactive. Once the MnF3 has been converted, the excess gas is vented for recycling, carrying the remaining gaseous impurities with it. The MnF4 is then heated to 380 °C to release fluorine at purities of up to 99.95%, reforming MnF3, which can be reused. By placing two reactors in parallel, the purification process can be made continuous, with one reactor taking in technical fluorine while the other delivers high-grade fluorine. Alternatively, the manganese tetrafluoride can be isolated and transported to where the fluorine is needed, at lower cost and greater safety than pressurized fluorine gas.

Fluoromanganate(IV) complexes
The yellow hexafluoromanganate(2−) of alkali metal and alkaline earth metal cations have been known since 1899, and can be prepared by the fluorination of MnF2 in the presence of the fluoride of the appropriate cation. They are much more stable than manganese tetrafluoride. Potassium hexafluoromanganate(IV), K2MnF6, can also be prepared by the controlled reduction of potassium permanganate in 50% aqueous hydrofluoric acid.
2 KMnO4 + 2 KF + 10 HF + 3 H2O2 → 2 K2MnF6 + 8 H2O + 3 O2

The pentafluoromanganate(1−)  salts of potassium, rubidium and caesium, MMnF5, can be prepared by fluorination of MMnF3 or by the reaction of [MnF4(py)(H2O)] with MF. The lemon-yellow heptafluoromanganate(3−) salts of the same metals, M3MnF7, have also been prepared.

When potassium hexafluoromanganate is doped into potassium fluorosilicate it forms a narrow band red phosphor.

Notes and references

Notes

References

Further reading
.
.

Manganese(IV) compounds
Fluorides
Metal halides
Fluorinating agents